The 1980 Turkish Consulate attack in Lyon was an attack on the Turkish Consulate General in Lyon on 5August 1980, where four people were wounded. Two Armenian gunmen stormed the Turkish Consulate General and demanded the location of the Consul General. When the doorman did not understand the gunmen's broken French, the gunmen opened fire. The Armenian Secret Army for the Liberation of Armenia (ASALA) claimed responsibility for the attack.

References

1980 in international relations
1980 murders in France
1980 mass shootings in Europe
1980 Turkish Consulate attack
Armenian Secret Army for the Liberation of Armenia
Attacks on diplomatic missions in France
Lyon, 1980
August 1980 crimes
August 1980 events in Europe
Turkish Consulate attack 
Consulate attack in Lyon
Mass shootings in France
Terrorist attacks attributed to Armenian militant groups
Terrorist incidents in France in 1980